This Is Fats is a 1957 studio album by American rock and roll pianist Fats Domino, released on Imperial Records.

Reception
The New Rolling Stone Album Guide scores this release alongside all of Domino's Imperial albums as 4.5 out of five stars.

Track listing
All songs written by Dave Bartholomew and Fats Domino, except where noted.

Side one:
"The Rooster Song" – 2:05
"My Happiness" (Borney Bergantine and Betty Peterson) – 2:14
"As Time Goes By" (Herman Hupfeld) – 1:38
"Hey La Bas" (Bartholomew) – 2:24
"Love Me" – 1:55
"Don’t You Hear Me Calling You" – 2:06
Side two:
"It’s You I Love" – 2:01
"Valley of Tears" – 1:52
"Where Did You Stay" – 2:00
"Baby Please" – 1:55
"Thinking of You" (R. Hall) – 2:09
"You Know I Miss You" (Domino and Al Young) – 2:12

References

External links

Review by George Starostin

1957 albums
Fats Domino albums
Imperial Records albums